Gornja Vranjska is a town in the municipality of Šabac, Serbia. According to the 2002 census, the town has a population of 1582 people.

Climate
Gornja Vranjska has an oceanic climate (Köppen climate classification: Cfb), closely bordering on a humid continental climate (Köppen climate classification: Dfb).

References

Populated places in Mačva District